The median palatal cyst is a rare cyst that may occur anywhere along the median palatal raphe. It may produce swelling because of infection and is treated by excision or surgical removal.

Some investigators now believe that this cyst represents a more posterior presentation of a nasopalatine duct cyst, rather than a separate cystic degeneration of epithelial rests at the line of fusion of the palatine shelves.

References

Cysts of the oral and maxillofacial region